In biology, a reflex, or reflex action, is an involuntary, unplanned sequence or action and nearly instantaneous response to a stimulus. 

Reflexes are found with varying levels of complexity in organisms with a nervous system. A reflex occurs via neural pathways in the nervous system called reflex arcs. A stimulus initiates a neural signal, which is carried to a synapse. The signal is then transferred across the synapse to a motor neuron which evokes a target response. These neural signals do not always travel to the brain, so many reflexes are an automatic response to a stimulus that does not receive or need conscious thought.

Many reflexes are fine-tuned to increase organism survival and self-defense. This is observed in reflexes such as the startle reflex, which provides an automatic response to an unexpected stimuli, and the feline righting reflex, which reorients a cat's body when falling to ensure safe landing. The simplest type of reflex, a short-latency reflex, has a single synapse, or junction, in the signaling pathway. Long-latency reflexes produce nerve signals that are transduced across multiple synapses before generating the reflex response.

Types of human reflexes

Myotatic reflexes

The myotatic or muscle stretch reflexes (sometimes known as deep tendon reflexes)  provide information on the integrity of the central nervous system and peripheral nervous system. This information can be detected using electromyography (EMG). Generally, decreased reflexes indicate a peripheral problem, and lively or exaggerated reflexes a central one. A stretch reflex is the contraction of a muscle in response to its lengthwise stretch.

 Biceps reflex (C5, C6)
 Brachioradialis reflex (C5, C6, C7)
 Extensor digitorum reflex (C6, C7)
 Triceps reflex (C6, C7, C8)
 Patellar reflex or knee-jerk reflex (L2, L3, L4)
 Ankle jerk reflex (Achilles reflex) (S1, S2)

While the reflexes above are stimulated mechanically, the term H-reflex refers to the analogous reflex stimulated electrically, and tonic vibration reflex for those stimulated to vibration.

Tendon reflex
A tendon reflex is the contraction of a muscle in response to striking its tendon. The Golgi tendon reflex is the inverse of a stretch reflex.

Reflexes involving cranial nerves

Reflexes usually only observed in human infants

Newborn babies have a number of other reflexes which are not seen in adults, referred to as primitive reflexes. These automatic reactions to stimuli enable infants to respond to the environment before any learning has taken place. They include:

 Asymmetrical tonic neck reflex (ATNR)
 Palmomental reflex
 Moro reflex, also known as the startle reflex
 Palmar grasp reflex
 Rooting reflex
 Sucking reflex
 Symmetrical tonic neck reflex (STNR)
 Tonic labyrinthine reflex (TLR)

Other kinds of reflexes
Other reflexes found in the central nervous system include:
 Abdominal reflexes (T6-L1) 
Gastrocolic reflex
 Anocutaneous reflex (S2-S4)
 Baroreflex
 Cough reflex
 Cremasteric reflex (L1-L2)
 Diving reflex
 Lazarus sign
 Muscular defense
 Photic sneeze reflex
 Scratch reflex
 Sneeze
 Startle reflex
 Withdrawal reflex
Crossed extensor reflex
Many of these reflexes are quite complex requiring a number of synapses in a number of different nuclei in the CNS (e.g., the escape reflex).  Others of these involve just a couple of synapses to function (e.g., the withdrawal reflex).
Processes such as breathing, digestion, and the maintenance of the heartbeat can also be regarded as reflex actions, according to some definitions of the term.

Grading
In medicine, reflexes are often used to assess the health of the nervous system.  Doctors will typically grade the activity of a reflex on a scale from 0 to 4.  While 2+ is considered normal, some healthy individuals are hypo-reflexive and register all reflexes at 1+, while others are hyper-reflexive and register all reflexes at 3+.

Reflex modulation 

Naively, we might imagine that reflexes are immutable. In reality, however, most reflexes are flexible and can be substantially modified to match the requirements of the behavior in both vertebrates and invertebrates.

A good example of reflex modulation is the stretch reflex. When a muscle is stretched at rest, the stretch reflex leads to contraction of the muscle, thereby opposing stretch (resistance reflex). This helps to stabilize posture. During voluntary movements, however, the intensity (gain) of the reflex is reduced or its sign is even reversed. This prevents resistance reflexes from impeding movements.

The underlying sites and mechanisms of reflex modulation are not fully understood. There is evidence that the output of sensory neurons is directly modulated during behavior—for example, through presynaptic inhibition. The effect of sensory input upon motor neurons is also influenced by interneurons in the spinal cord or ventral nerve cord and by descending signals from the brain.

Other reflexes
Breathing can also be considered both involuntary and voluntary, since breath can be held through internal intercostal muscles.

See also 
 All-or-none law
 Automatic behavior
 Conditioned reflex
 Instinct
 Jumping Frenchmen of Maine
 List of reflexes (alphabetical)
 Preflexes
 Voluntary action

References 

Reflexes
Animal physiology